The Ghana Women's FA Cup, is the top women's knockout tournament of the Ghanaian association football. The competition is played between the clubs of the Ghana Women's Premier League and Division One League. The inaugural winners of the competition were Police Ladies.

History 
The Ghana Women's FA Cup was launched in 2016 by the Women’s League Board (WLB) of Ghana Football Association (GFA) as the highest women's knockout tournament. The first four editions of the competitions from 2016 to 2020 were sponsored by Sanford Women’s Clinic. In 2016, Police Ladies defeated Fabulous Ladies by 2–1 to win the maiden edition of the cup. Princella Adubea of Ampem Darko Ladies won the top goal scorer of the competition with 6 goals, whilst Suzy Teye Dede of Lady Strikers was also awarded as the discovery of the tournament.

Sponsorship 
The first four editions of the competitions from 2016 to 2020 were sponsored by Sanford Women’s Clinic.

In June 2021, the GFA announced that Electroland Ghana Ltd, distributors of NASCO electronic appliances and sponsors of the Player of the Match award for the Women’s Premier League had extended their sponsorship package to the Women’s FA Cup competition, with players who were adjudged as best players from the Round of 16 and Quarter-finals were to receive a NASCO Hand dryer and a sleek NASCO Mobile Phone each. The best players from the Semi-finals and the Final game were also entitled to products from NASCO.

Winners

See also 

 Ghanaian FA Cup
 Ghana Women's Premier League
Ghana Women's Super Cup

References

External links 

 Ghana Women's FA Cup category
 Official Website

Football competitions in Ghana
Women's national association football cups
Women's football competitions in Ghana
Ghana Women's FA Cup